Christopher Carson Cheek (born September 16, 1968) is an American jazz saxophonist.

Biography
Cheek was born in St. Louis, Missouri, where his father was the director of a Junior high school band. Cheek began learning to play the alto saxophone at age eleven, and upon graduation from high school, he attended Webster University. He studied at the Berklee College of Music under Joe Viola, Hal Crook, and Herb Pomeroy, and earned his bachelor's degree. He moved to New York City in 1992, where he played with Paul Motian in the Electric Bebop Band, and co-founded Bloomdaddies with Seamus Blake. He also played with Guillermo Klein, Mika Pohjola, Luciana Souza, and David Berkman.

His debut release as a leader, I Wish I Knew, appeared in 1997 and featured Kurt Rosenwinkel, and by 2010, three more solo albums with Cheek as bandleader on the Fresh Sound label followed; A Girl Named Joe (1997), Vine (1999), and Blues Cruise, in 2005. Two albums as co-leader – Lazy Afternoon and Guilty – were released by Blue Moon in 2002. In 2016 another CD, Saturday Songs, was released by Sunnyside Records and recorded at Supertone Records, Valencia. Criss Cross Jazz have also released two Cheek albums with co-leader Seamus Blake. Cheek has appeared on more than one hundred albums as a session musician.

Discography

As leader/co-leader

As member 
The Bloomdaddies
With Seamus Blake, Jesse Murphy, Jorge Rossy and Dan Reiser
 The Bloomdaddies (Criss Cross Jazz, 1996) – recorded in 1995
 Racer X (self-released, 1998)
 Mosh For Lovers (Fresh Sound New Talent, 2002) – recorded in 2001

As sideman 

With Frank Carlberg
 The Crazy Woman (Accurate, 1995)
 Variations on a Summer Day (Fresh Sound New Talent, 2000)
 In the Land of Art (Fresh Sound New Talent, 2005)
 State of the Union (Fresh Sound New Talent, 2006)
 Uncivilized Ruminations (Red Piano)

With Jen Chapin
 Revisions - Songs of Stevie Wonder (Chesky, 2009)
 Live at the Bitter End (Purple Chair Music, 1999)

With Alan Ferber
 March Sublime (Sunnyside, 2013) – recorded in 2012
 Jigsaw (Sunnyside, 2017)

With Stephane Furic
 Kishinev (Soul Note, 1990)
 The Twitter Machine (Soul Note, 1992)
 Crossing Brooklyn Ferry (Soul Note, 1995)
 Music for 3 (Soul Note, 1997)
 Jugendstil (ESP-Disk, 2008)
 Jugendstil II (ESP-Disk, 2010)

With Charlie Haden's Liberation Music Orchestra
 2004: Not in Our Name (Verve, 2005)
 2011–15: Time/Life (Impulse!, 2016)

With Guillermo Klein
 Los Guachos II (Sunnyside, 1999)
 Los Guachos III (Sunnyside, 2002)
 Filtros (Sunnyside, 2008)
 Carrera (Sunnyside, 2012)
 Los Guachos V (Sunnyside, 2016)

With Chris Lightcap's Bigmouth
 Epicenter (Clean Feed, 2015)
 Deluxe (Clean Feed, 2010)

With Paul Motian and the Electric Bebop Band
 Reincarnation of a Love Bird (JMT, 1994)
 Flight of the Blue Jay (Winter & Winter 1996)
 Play Monk and Powell (Winter & Winter, 1998)
 Europe (Winter & Winter, 2000)
 Holiday for Strings (Winter & Winter, 2001)
 Garden of Eden (ECM, 2004)

With Wolfgang Muthspiel
 In and Out (Amadeo, 1993)
 Daily Mirror (Material, 2000)

With Mika Pohjola
 The Secret of the Castle (Blue Music Group, 1997)
 Announcement (Blue Music Group, 1997)

With Rudder
 Matorning (19/8, 2009)
 Rudder (19/8, 2007)

With others
 Burak Bedikyan, Leap of Faith (SteepleChase, 2015) – recorded in 2014
 Brooklyn Boogaloo Blowout, The Boog At Sunny's (Story Sound, 2017)[2CD] – live recorded in 2016
 FOX, Pelican Blues''' (Jazz&People, 2016)
 Jared Gold, Intuition (Posi-Tone, 2012)
 Stephane Huchard, Panamerican (Jazz Village, 2013)
 Brad Mehldau, Finding Gabriel (Nonesuch, 2019) – recorded in 2017-18
 Pierre Perchaud, Waterfalls (Gemini, 2012)
 Luciana Souza, The Poems of Elizabeth Bishop and Other Songs (Sunnyside, 2000)
 Steve Swallow, Into the Woodwork (XtraWATT/ECM, 2013) – recorded in 2011
 Miguel Zenón, Identities are Changeable'' (Miel Music, 2014)

References

External links
Official site

1968 births
21st-century American saxophonists
21st-century American male musicians
American jazz saxophonists
American male jazz musicians
American male saxophonists
Berklee College of Music alumni
Jazz musicians from Missouri
Living people
The Delphian Jazz Orchestra members
Webster University alumni